Edward Adam Leatham (2 August 1828 – 6 February 1900) was an English Liberal Member of Parliament.

Background and early life
Leatham was the son of William Leatham of Heath near Wakefield, by his wife Margaret Walker, daughter and heiress of Joshua Walker, of York. The family was part of an influential Quaker community in Yorkshire. His brother William Henry Leatham was MP for Wakefield and Southern West Riding, and his sister Margaret Elizabeth Leatham married the liberal statesman John Bright. He was educated at University College London, graduating BA in 1848 and MA in 1851. He was later elected Fellow of the college.

Political career
Leatham was elected MP for Huddersfield in 1859 but gave up the seat in 1865. In 1861 he instituted the Huddersfield College Prize Medals for history and English declamation which were awarded for the two subjects in alternate years.  He was re-elected for Huddersfield in 1868 and held the seat until 1886. In 1875, he acquired an estate at Miserden, Gloucestershire. He was a Justice of the peace and Deputy Lieutenant for the West Riding of Yorkshire, and later a Deputy Lieutenant for Gloucestershire, of which county he was High Sheriff in 1891.

He was a scholar and published Charmione: A Tale of the Great Athenian Revolution in 1858. His politics was heavily influenced by his brother-in-law Bright's ideas. For example, Leatham introduced the bill that would become the Ballot Act 1872.

Leatham died at his residence at Miserden, on 6 February 1900 aged 71.

Family
Leatham was twice married. He first married Mary Jane Fowler of Melksham in 1851. Following her death, he married a daughter of Rev. John Constable, and she survived him. His eldest son was A. W. Leatham.

References

External links 
 

1828 births
1900 deaths
Politicians from Wakefield
Liberal Party (UK) MPs for English constituencies
UK MPs 1859–1865
UK MPs 1868–1874
UK MPs 1874–1880
UK MPs 1880–1885
High Sheriffs of Gloucestershire